This is the discography of British post-punk band A Certain Ratio.

Albums

Studio albums

Live albums

Remix albums

Compilation albums

EPs

Singles

Notes

References

Discographies of British artists
Rock music group discographies
New wave discographies
Funk music discographies